Sri Lanka is a tropical island situated close to the southern tip of India. The invertebrate fauna is as large as it is common to other regions of the world. There are about 2 million species of arthropods found in the world, and still it is counting. So many new species are discover up to this time also. So it is very complicated and difficult to summarize the exact number of species found within a certain region.

This a list of the mosquitoes found from Sri Lanka.

Mosquito
Phylum: Arthropoda   Class: Insecta
Order: Diptera
 
Family: Culicidae

Mosquitoes are small midge-like insects that can be found in terrestrial ecosystems wherever water is abundant. Females of most species are ectoparasites, whose tube-like mouthparts (called a proboscis) pierce the hosts' skin to consume blood. Many species of mosquitoes are vectors of diseases, so important in medicine and other fields. Well over 3,500 species of mosquitoes were found and described, and new species are about to discover. Sri Lanka is home to 131 species of mosquitoes that included to 16 genera with 17 endemic species.

Endemic species are highlighted with letter E.

Subfamily Anophelinae
Anopheles aconitus Dönitz 1902
Anopheles aitkenii James 1903
Anopheles annularis van der Wulp 1884
Anopheles barbirostris Van der Wulp 1884
Anopheles barbumbrosus Strickland & Chowdhury 1927
Anopheles culicifacies Giles, 1901
Anopheles elegans James 1903
Anopheles gigas Giles 1901 - E
Anopheles insulaeflorum Swellengrebel & Swellengrebel de Graaf 1919
Anopheles interruptus Puri 1929
Anopheles jamesii Theobald 1901
Anopheles karwari James 1903
Anopheles nigerrimus Giles 1900
Anopheles pallidus Theobald 1901
Anopheles peditaeniatus Leicester 1908
Anopheles quadrimaculatus Say 1824
Anopheles reidi Harrison 1973 - E
Anopheles subpictus Grassi 1899
Anopheles tessellatus Theobald
Anopheles vagus Dönitz 1902
Anopheles varuna Iyengar 1924

Subfamily Culicinae
Aedeomyia catasticta Knab 1909
Aedes aegypti (Linnaeus) 1762
Aedes albolateralis (Theobald) 1908
Aedes albopictus (Skuse) 1894
Aedes alboscutellatus (Theobald) 1905
Aedes albotaeniatus (Leicester) 1904
Aedes annulirostris (Theobald) 1905
Aedes argenteoscutellatus Carter & Wijesundara 1948 - E
Aedes butleri Theobald 1901
Aedes chrysolineatus (Theobald) 1907
Aedes greenii (Theobald) 1903
Aedes gubernatoris (Giles) 1901
Aedes harveyi (Barraud) 1923
Aedes indicus (Theobald) 1907
Aedes jamesi (Edwards) 1914
Aedes krombeini (Huang Y-M 1975) - E
Aedes lankaensis Stone & Night 1958 - E
Aedes lineatopennis (Ludlow) 1905
Aedes macdougalli Edwards 1922
Aedes mediopunctatus (Theobald) 1905 - E
Aedes niveus (Ludlow) 1903
Aedes ostentatio (Leicester) 1908
Aedes pallidostriatus (Theobald) 1907
Aedes petroelephantus Wijesundara 1951 - E
Aedes pipersalatus (Giles) 1902
Aedes pseudomediofasciatus (Theobald) 1910
Aedes pseudotaeniatus (Giles) 1901
Aedes quasiferinus Mattingly 1961
Aedes ramachandrai Reuben 1972
Aedes reginae Edwards 1922
Aedes scatophagoides (Theobald) 1901
Aedes seculatus Menon 1950
Aedes simplex (Theobald) 1903 - E
Aedes spermathecus Wijesundara 1951 - E
Aedes srilankensis (Reinert J.F. 1977) - E
Aedes stenoetrus (Theobald) 1907
Aedes taeniorhyncoides (Christophers) 1911
Aedes thomsoni (Theobald) 1905
Aedes vexans (Meigen) 1830
Aedes vittatus (Bigot) 1861
Aedes wardi Reinert, 1976
Aedes yerburyi Edwards. 1917 - E
Armigeres aureolineatus (Leicester) 1908
Armigeres subalbatus (Coquillett) 1898
Armigeres magnus (Theobald) 1908
Armigeres omissus (Edwards) 1914
Coquillettidia crassipes (Van der Wulp) 1881
Culex bahri (Edwards) 1914 - E
Culex bailyi Barraud 1934
Culex bicornutus (Theobald) 1910
Culex bitaeniorhynchus Giles 1901
Culex brevipalpis (Giles) 1902
Culex campilunati Carter & Wijesundara 1948 - E
Culex castrensis Edwards 1922
Culex fragilis Ludlow 1903
Culex fuscanus Weidemann 1820
Culex fuscocephala Theobald 1907
Culex gelidus Theobald 1901
Culex halifaxi Theobald 1903
Culex infantulus Edwards 1922
Culex infula Theobald 1901
Culex jacksoni Edwards 1934
Culex lasiopalpis (Sirivanakarn S. 1977) - E
Culex malayi (Leicester) 1908
Culex mamilifer (Leicester) 1908
Culex mimulus Edwards 1915
Culex minutissimus (Theobald) 1907
Culex nigropunctatus Edwards 1926
Culex pallidothorax Theobald 1905
Culex pluvialis Barraud 1924
Culex pseudovishnui Colless 1957
Culex quadripalpis (Edwards) 1914
Culex quinquefasciatus Say 1823
Culex rubithoracis (Leicester) 1908
Culex sinensis Theobald 1903
Culex sitiens Weidemann 1828
Culex spathifurca (Edwards) 1915
Culex tritaeniorhynchus Giles 1901
Culex uniformis (Theobald) 1905
Culex vishnui Theobald 1901
Culex wardi (Sirivanakarn S. 1977) - E
Culex whitmorei (Giles) 1904
Ficalbia minima (Theobald) 1901
Heizmannia greenii (Theobald) 1905
Heizmannia carteri Amerasinghe, 1993
Hodgesia bailyi Barraud 1929
Hodgesia malayi Leicester 1908
Malaya genurostris Leicester. 1908
Mansonia annulifera (Theobald) 1901
Mansonia indiana Edwards. 1930
Mansonia uniformis (Theobald) 1901
Mimomyia chamberlaini (Ludlow) 1904
Mimomyia hybrida Leicester. 1908
Mimomyia intermedia (Barraud) 1929
Mimomyia luzonensis (Ludlow) 1905
Orthopodomyia anopheloides (Giles) 1903
Orthopodomyia flavithorax Barraud 1927
Toxorhynchites minimus (Thoebald) 1905
Toxorhynchites splendens (Wiedemann) 1819
Tripteroides affinis (Edwards) 1913
Tripteroides aranoides (Theobald) 1901
Tripteroides dofleini (Gunther) 1913 - E
Uranotaenia bicolor Leicester 1908
Uranotaenia campestris Leicester 1908
Uranotaenia lateralis Ludlow 1905
Uranotaenia nivipleura Leicestor 1908
Uranotaenia obscura Edwards 1915
Uranotaenia rutherfordi Edwards 1922 - E
Uranotaenia srilankensis Payton 1974 - E

References

Culicidae
 
Mosquitoes
Sri Lanka